Labosse is a commune in the Oise department in northern France. The commune of Labosse is part of the canton of Beauvais-2 and of the arrondissement of Beauvais. As of 2019, there are 237 dwellings in the commune, of which 168 principal residences.

See also
 Communes of the Oise department

References

Communes of Oise